13 is the thirteenth studio album by Bosnian Serb turbo folk recording artist Marta Savić. It was released 24 October 2011 through the record label K::CN Records.

Singles
"Na istoj sam adresi" was the album's lead single, released 23 September 2010. The second single was "Ja nisam tavka", released 20 August 2011.

"Idiot", the album's third single, was released 15 September 2011 along with the music video. The video was removed from YouTube for its graphic sex scenes and a censored version was re-uploaded in its place.

The fourth single was "Mama" featuring Azis and Mirko Gavrić. The music video for "Mama" was filmed 18 September 2011 for €12,000. It premiered 5 December 2011.

Track listing

Personnel

Instruments

 Lejla Hot – backing vocals
 Mirko Gavrić – backing vocals
 Aleksandar Ilić Prke – drums
 Petar Trumbetaš – guitar, bouzouki
 Kalin Georgiev – kaval, fife
 Marko Tropico – keyboards

Production and recording
 Miraco Music – producing, mixing, mastering

Crew

 Petar Peđa Božić – hair
 Valerija Milovanović – make-up
 Mirko Gavrić – photography

References

External links
 13 at Discogs

2011 albums
Marta Savić albums